Plasmodium schwetzi is a parasite of the genus Plasmodium subgenus Plasmodium.

Like all Plasmodium species P. schwetzi has both vertebrate and insect hosts. The vertebrate hosts for this parasite are mammals.

Description 

P. schwetzi was first described by Reichenow in 1920 in blood apes in Cameroon.

The parasite resembles both Plasmodium vivax and Plasmodium ovale.

Geographical occurrence 

This species is found in Cameroon.

Clinical features and host pathology 

This species may occasionally infect man.

Vectors

Anopheles balabacensis balabacensis

References 

schwetzi